Guasayán might refer to:

Guasayán Department in Santiago del Estero Province, Argentina
San Pedro de Guasayán, capital of the forementioned department.